Trevor Elias Einhorn (born November 3, 1988) is an American actor. In television, he is known for playing Josh on Syfy's fantasy series The Magicians and Frederick Crane on the American sitcom Frasier.

Career 
Einhorn was a child actor and landed his first big role as recurring character Frederick Crane on Frasier.

He made an appearance in an episode of The Office as Justin Polznik, a student interested in an internship at Dunder Mifflin. He also guested as a young sex-driven patient of Berg's in Two Guys and a Girl. In the movie BASEketball he played the role of Joey Thomas. He also played the role of Henry Walker on Sons & Daughters.

Einhorn appeared with Kiefer Sutherland in the "Dynamite Cupcakes" television commercial for Acer laptops. He appeared in the sixth and seventh seasons of Mad Men, as copywriter John Mathis. Other recent work includes reprising ’Neil Kellerman’ in the ABC remake of the film Dirty Dancing.

Einhorn also co-starred in The Magicians, based on the eponymous book series by Lev Grossman, as Josh Hoberman.

Filmography

Film

Television

References

External links 
 

1988 births
Living people
Male actors from Los Angeles
American male child actors
American male film actors
American male television actors